Victor Mykolayovych Deysun (born 22 July 1962 in Kamianets-Podilskyi, Ukraine) is a Ukrainian abstract expressionist painter.

Early life and education 
Deysun was born on July 22, 1962 in the city of Kamianets-Podilskiy.

Artistic career
Deysun graduated from Kyiv State School of Arts and later from Lviv Academy of Arts. His teachers included Arkadiy Milkovitsky, Volodymyr Cherkasov, Peter Kravchenko, Yuriy Fedorovych Yurchik. He is a member of the National Union of Artists of Ukraine. He is also a member of the BJ-Art artistic group. His paintings are kept in the private collections in Ukraine, Russia, Poland, Hungary, Germany, Canada, United States, Israel, France, Great Britain, China, and in museum collections such as the Lviv National Museum, Poltava Museum of Local Lore, Krementchuk Museum of Local Lore, Kamianets-Podilskiy art gallery. His works are sold at auction Phillips.

Main one-man exhibitions
2014 – "Drawings on the fence", Mystetska Zbirka art gallery, Kyiv, Ukraine

2013 – “Red and Black”, painting, installation, Mystetska Zbirka art gallery, Kyiv, Ukraine

2013 – Viktor Deysun, Carlos Garcia Laos, Museum of Modern Art of Ukraine, “Fragmentation”, Kyiv, Ukraine

2012 – Kunstamt Art Gallery, Tübingen, Germany

2012 – “Hogging Off a Tiger”, painting, Mystetska Zbirka art gallery, Kyiv, Ukraine

2011 – “Optimalism”, painting, Mystetska Zbirka art gallery, Kyiv, Ukraine

2010 – Kamianets Podilskiy art gallery, Kamianets Podilskiy, Ukraine

2008 – Gryfon art gallery, Kyiv, Ukraine

2007 – Gallery “36”, Kyiv, Ukraine

2006 – Coffee shop Antresol, Kyiv, Ukraine

2002 – Gryfon art gallery, Kyiv, Ukraine

2002 – Dialog art club, Odesa, Ukraine

2001 – Kavaleridze museum-workshop gallery, Kyiv, Ukraine

1998 – Solo exhibition of paintings, Local lore museum, Kremenchuk, Ukraine

1994 – Gallery of the Slavutych arts center, Kyiv, Ukraine

1993 – Solo exhibition of paintings and installation, Exhibition hall of the Union of Artists of Ukraine, Kremenchuk, Ukraine

1992 – Lviv National Museum, Lviv, Ukraine

Group exhibitions
2015 – Group exhibition “MAKE ART NOT WAR”, Mystetska Zbirka art gallery, Kyiv, Ukraine

2015 – Ukrainian Fashion Week

2014 – Group exhibition “Ukraine. Archetype of freedom”, Novomatic Forum, Vienna, Austria

2013 – Auction exhibition, 10.12.13, Under the influence, Auction House Phillips, London, Great Britain

2013 – IX Art Kyiv Contemporary, "Warm up Ukraine", Mystetsky Arsenal, Kyiv, Ukraine

2013 – Arts and crafts exhibition, expocenter, city of Changchun, Province Jilin, China

2013 – “Winter-tide” group exhibition, Mystetska Zbirka art gallery, Kyiv, Ukraine

2012 – “Cities of the World” group exhibition, Mystetska Zbirka art gallery, Kyiv, Ukraine

2011 – Fine Art Ukraine, Mystetsky Arsenal, Kyiv, Ukraine

2010 – Pre-show exhibition, the Auction House “Epoch”, Kyiv, Ukraine

2010 – Gogolfest, Dovzhenko Film Studios, Kyiv, Ukraine

2006 – “World of Primer” exhibition, National museum, Lviv, Ukraine

2003 – Tokai gallery, city of Tokai, Hungary

2001 – Tendenz art Galerie, Paderborn, Germany

2001 – Project-01 “Spring Wind”, open air, Poskotyna hill, city of Kyiv, Ukraine

2001 – Picturesque Ukraine-2001, Union of the Artists of Ukraine, city of Kyiv, Ukraine

2000 – Autumn salon – Vysoky Zamok-2000, city of Lviv, Ukraine

2000 – 2000 years under the star of Bethlehem, city of Odessa, Ukraine

1999 – V International art festival, city of Kyiv, Ukraine

1995 – Pan-Ukraine-95, city of Dnipropetrivsk, Ukraine

1990 – “Impreza”, International exhibition, city of Ivano-Frankivsk, Ukraine

1997 – Autumn salon-97, Union of the Artists of Ukraine, city of Kyiv, Ukraine

1995 – Picturesque Ukraine- 95, Union of the Artists of Ukraine, city of Kyiv, Ukraine

1994 – Spring Exhibition -94, Union of the Artists of Ukraine, city of Kyiv, Ukraine

1993 – “Flowers of Hope”, Union of the Artists of Ukraine, city of Kyiv, Ukraine

References

1962 births
Living people
People from Kamianets-Podilskyi
Ukrainian painters
Ukrainian male painters